Ivar Kåge (21 February 1881 – 21 April 1951) was a Swedish film actor. He appeared in more than 50 films between 1913 and 1949.

Selected filmography

 The Conflicts of Life (1913)
 Where the Lighthouse Flashes (1924)
 The Million Dollars (1926)
 Modern Wives (1932)
 Kanske en gentleman (1935)
 Walpurgis Night (1935)
 The Quartet That Split Up (1936)
 Russian Flu (1937)
 John Ericsson, Victor of Hampton Roads (1937)
 The People of Högbogården (1939)
 We at Solglantan (1939)
 Life Begins Today (1939)
 A Sailor on Horseback (1940)
 Heroes in Yellow and Blue (1940)
 A Crime (1940)
 General von Döbeln (1942)
 Dangerous Ways (1942)
 The Case of Ingegerd Bremssen (1942)
 There's a Fire Burning (1943)
 Bambi (1943)
 Life in the Country (1943)
 The Old Clock at Ronneberga (1944)
 Turn of the Century (1944)
 His Excellency (1944)
 The Happy Tailor (1945)
  Kristin Commands (1946)
 Incorrigible (1946)
 Soldier's Reminder (1947)
 The Girl from the Marsh Croft (1947)
 Life Starts Now (1948)
 On These Shoulders (1948)
 Playing Truant (1949)
 Bohus Battalion (1949)
 Realm of Man (1949)

External links

1881 births
1951 deaths
Swedish male film actors
Swedish male silent film actors
20th-century Swedish male actors
Male actors from Stockholm